Freddy Hinestroza Arias (born 5 April 1990) is a Colombian professional footballer who plays as a winger for Junior.

Club career
Born in Medellín, Hinestroza played for lowly CF Ferroválvulas de Medellín before passing in a trial at Atlético Nacional in October 2010. He failed to adapt into his new team, suffering with injuries and being also with dual registration problems.

Despite appearing regularly during the pre-season (also occasionally playing as a left back), He only appeared in one league game for Atlético Nacional, a 1–2 home loss against La Equidad on 31 August 2011.

On 23 January 2012 Hinestroza moved to La Equidad. He scored his first goal on 17 June, netting his side's last in a 2–2 home draw against Independiente Santa Fe. He was an ever-present midfield unit during Equidad's following campaigns.

On 8 July 2014 Hinestroza moved abroad for the first time in his career, joining La Liga side Getafe CF in a one-year loan deal. He made his debut in the competition on 24 August, coming on as a second half substitute for Pablo Sarabia in a 1–3 away loss against Celta de Vigo.

On 5 August 2015 Hinestroza was loaned to Real Zaragoza in Segunda División, for one year.

International career
Hinestroza made his debut for the Colombia national team on 16 January 2022 in a 2–1 home win over Honduras.

Honours

Club

Atlético Nacional
Categoría Primera A: 2011–I
Junior
Superliga Colombiana (1): 2019

References

External links
 
 
 
 

1990 births
Living people
Footballers from Medellín
Colombian footballers
Association football wingers
Categoría Primera A players
La Liga players
Segunda División players
Liga MX players
Atlético Nacional footballers
La Equidad footballers
Getafe CF footballers
Real Zaragoza players
Santos Laguna footballers
C.D. Veracruz footballers
Águilas Doradas Rionegro players
Atlético Junior footballers
Colombian expatriate footballers
Colombian expatriate sportspeople in Spain
Expatriate footballers in Spain
Expatriate footballers in Mexico